The New Zealand women's cricket team played the Pakistan women's cricket team in the United Arab Emirates from 31 October to 14 November 2017. The tour consisted of three Women's One Day Internationals (WODIs) and four Women's Twenty20 Internationals (WT20Is). The WODI games were part of the 2017–20 ICC Women's Championship. It was the first time that New Zealand Women played an away series against Pakistan. Ahead of the series, Bismah Maroof was made captain of Pakistan women's ODI team, after Sana Mir was axed from the role. New Zealand Women won the WODI series 2–1 and the WT20I series 4–0.

Squads

WODI series

1st WODI

2nd WODI

3rd WODI

WT20I series

1st WT20I

2nd WT20I

3rd WT20I

4th WT20I

References

External links
 Series home at ESPN Cricinfo

2017–20 ICC Women's Championship
Pakistan 2014
2017 in New Zealand cricket
2017 in Pakistani cricket
International cricket competitions in 2017–18
Pakistan women's national cricket team
International cricket competitions in the United Arab Emirates
cricket
2017 in women's cricket
2017 in Emirati cricket